Honorary Captain Hawa Singh (16 December 1937 in Umarwas, Haryana – 14 August 2000, in Bhiwani, Haryana) was an Indian Heavyweight boxer, who dominated Indian and Asian amateur boxing for a decade in his weight class. He won the Asian Games gold medal in Heavyweight category in consecutive editions of the games in the 1966 Asiad and the 1970 Asiad both held in Bangkok, Thailand - a feat unmatched by any Indian boxer to date (August 2008). He won the National Championships in the Heavyweight category a record 11 consecutive times — from 1961 to 1972.

Biography
Hawa Singh Sheoran was born in a Jat Family now Haryana in 1937. He enrolled in the Indian Army in 1956, and became the champion of the Western Command in 1960 by defeating the defending champion, Mohabbat Singh. He won the National Championships for 11 straight years from 1961 to 1972, winning gold medals at the 1966 Asian Games and the 1970 Asian Games in Bangkok. He was awarded the Arjuna Award, India's highest sporting award, in 1966.. Biopic on Hawa Singh will be produced by Kamlesh Singh Kushwaha and Sam Fernandes. The film is written by Junaid Wasi and shall be directed by Prakash Nambiar.

After retiring, he took up coaching and was the co-founder of the Bhiwani Boxing Club which produced a slew of Indian boxers in the 1990s and 2000s (decade), including Olympic medallist Vijender Singh. He was awarded the Dronacharya Award in 1999.

He died suddenly in Bhiwani on 14 August 2000 – 15 days before he was to have received the Dronacharya Award. On 4 February 2020, Salman Khan announced a biopic featuring Sooraj Pancholi as Hawa Singh.

Notes

References
Biography of Hawa Singh*India's highest sporting awards and those who won them, SS Gandhi, The Defence Review

Indian male boxers
People from Bhiwani district
Recipients of the Dronacharya Award
Recipients of the Arjuna Award
1937 births
2000 deaths
Asian Games gold medalists for India
Boxers from Haryana
Asian Games medalists in boxing
Boxers at the 1966 Asian Games
Boxers at the 1970 Asian Games
Medalists at the 1966 Asian Games
Medalists at the 1970 Asian Games
Heavyweight boxers